America is an album by American jazz trumpeter Wadada Leo Smith and drummer Jack DeJohnette which was recorded in 2008 and released on Tzadik Records. It was their first duo recording, a collaboration originally proposed to ECM in 1979 and rejected.

Reception

In his review for AllMusic, Phil Freeman states "The austere stillness at the heart of Smith's music is anchored and emphasized by DeJohnette's powerful mastery of the drum kit, adding up to a record that deserves to be placed alongside Don Cherry and Ed Blackwell's Mu sessions in the avant-jazz pantheon."

The All About Jazz review by Troy Collins notes "Their interplay is measured and precise, neither overwrought nor timid, lending America an air of regal austerity—the sound of two masters engaged in an intimate musical conversation."

Track listing
All compositions by Wadada Leo Smith
 "America Parts 1,2,3" - 14:23
 "Red Trumpet" - 7:53
 "John Brown's Fort" - 5:59
 "Ed Blackwell, The Blue Mountain Sun Drummer" - 10:13
 "Rabia's Unconditional Love, a Spiritual Mystery of the Heart" - 7:08
 "The Masnavi: The Falcon and the Owls" - 7:34

Personnel
Wadada Leo Smith - trumpet, flugelhorn
Jack DeJohnette - drums

References

2009 albums
Wadada Leo Smith albums
Tzadik Records albums